The Air Creation Pixel is a French ultralight trike, designed and produced by Air Creation of Aubenas. The aircraft is supplied complete and ready-to-fly or as a kit for amateur construction.

Design and development
The Pixel was designed to comply with the Fédération Aéronautique Internationale microlight category, the US FAR 103 Ultralight Vehicles rules and the German 120 kg class.

The aircraft design features a cable-braced hang glider-style high-wing, weight-shift controls, a single-seat open cockpit without a cockpit fairing, tricycle landing gear and a single engine in pusher configuration.

The aircraft is made from bolted-together aluminum tubing, with its double surface wing covered in Dacron sailcloth. The powerplant is a single-cylinder, air-cooled, two-stroke, single-ignition  Polini Thor 250 engine.

A number of different wings can be fitted to the basic carriage, although the purpose-designed iFun 13 is standard. That wing is available as a "short pack" with optional rigid struts to facilitate hangar storage folded with the wing remaining on the trike carriage.

The Pixel is available in the XC model, which includes a windshield, instrument panel, electric starter, hand throttle, canvas siding and baggage storage compartment. A pneumatic ballistic parachute is optional and adds  to the empty weight.

Specifications (iFun 13 Pixel XC)

References

External links

Pixel
2010s French sport aircraft
2010s French ultralight aircraft
Single-engined pusher aircraft
Ultralight trikes
Homebuilt aircraft